Belvidere Plantation House, also known as the Merrick-Nixon House, is a historic plantation house located near Hampstead, Pender County, North Carolina, USA. It was built about 1810 for slaveholder George Merrick, and is a 1½-story, three bay, gambrel-roofed dwelling with Georgian, Federal, and Greek Revival style design elements.  It is sheathed in weatherboard and has exterior end chimneys and a shed-roofed front porch.

It was listed on the National Register of Historic Places in 1982.

References

Plantation houses in North Carolina
Houses on the National Register of Historic Places in North Carolina
Georgian architecture in North Carolina
Federal architecture in North Carolina
Greek Revival houses in North Carolina
Houses completed in 1810
Houses in Pender County, North Carolina
National Register of Historic Places in Pender County, North Carolina